The 1895 San Diego mayoral election was held on April 2, 1895 to elect the mayor for San Diego. Incumbent Mayor William H. Carlson was reelected Mayor with a plurality of the votes.

Candidates
William H. Carlson, Mayor of San Diego
Charles S. Hamilton
W.A. Sloane, judge
Daniel Stone

Campaign
Incumbent Mayor William H. Carlson stood for re-election to a second term as an independent. His reelection was contested by W.A. Sloane, a Republican, Charles S. Hamilton, a Democrat, and Daniel Stone, a Populist.

On April 2, 1895, Carlson was narrowly re-elected mayor with a plurality of 33.9 percent of the vote. Stone came in second with 31.6 percent of the vote. Sloane and Hamilton trailed behind with 18.1 percent and 16.4 percent respectively.

Election results

References

1895
1895 California elections
1890s in San Diego
1895 United States mayoral elections
April 1895 events